Columbia Foundation Senior Secondary School is a senior-secondary level school situated in D Block, Vikas Puri, Delhi, India. The school was founded by R. C. Verma in 1985.

See also
Education in India
Education in Delhi
List of schools in Delhi
 CBSE

References

External links
 

Schools in West Delhi
Schools in Delhi